Viengkham district may refer to:

Viengkham district, Luang Prabang, Laos
Viengkham district, Vientiane, Laos